The Tetragrammaton is the four-letter scriptural name of the God of Israel.

Tetragrammaton may also refer to:
Tetragrammaton Labyrinth, a 2005 manga
Tetragrammaton Records, a company
Tetragrammaton, a brain technology  in the David Brin novel Kiln People
Tetragrammaton, a council in the film Equilibrium
"Tetragrammaton", a song on The Mars Volta album Amputechture
Tetragrammaton, a single by Susumu Hirasawa + InhVmaN

See also 
 Abrahamic God
 Jah
 Jehovah
 Names of God in Judaism
 Yahweh